Veltheim is a district in the Swiss city of Winterthur. It is district number 5.

The district comprises the quarters Rosenberg and Blumenau.

Veltheim was formerly a municipality of its own, but was incorporated into Winterthur in 1922.

References

Winterthur
Former municipalities of the canton of Zürich